René Roussel (27 July 1885 – 10 January 1962) was a French painter. His work was part of the painting event in the art competition at the 1924 Summer Olympics.

References

1885 births
1962 deaths
19th-century French painters
20th-century French painters
20th-century French male artists
French male painters
Olympic competitors in art competitions
People from Seine-et-Marne
19th-century French male artists